Chirote also known as Chiroti is a delicacy predominantly served in Maharashtra and former Bombay State areas in Karnataka. It is also famous in parts of Telangana state, especially in the district of Nalgonda where it is known by the name Pheni/Peni. It is served as a dessert on special occasions such as a festival or a wedding.

It's prepared  by rolling out kneaded dough made of maida into layered circular shapes and then deep frying in ghee or refined oil. The outcome resembles a semi golden brown fluffy poori, which is then sprinkled liberally with powdered sugar and optionally grated almonds and cashew.

See also
 List of fried dough foods
 List of Indian dishes

References

External links
 Chiroti Recipe
 Chiroti/Chirote

Vegetarian dishes of India
Karnataka cuisine
Deep fried foods